The 2004–05 Duke Blue Devils men's basketball team represented Duke University during the 2004-05 men's college basketball season. Mike Krzyzewski had turned down a $40 million offer in the offseason to become the head coach of the Los Angeles Lakers to return for his 25th season and rebuild a team that lost Chris Duhon to graduation, Luol Deng to the pros and recruit Shaun Livingston altogether for the NBA draft.  For the first time in five years, Duke was not picked to win the ACC.

Roster

Schedule

|-
!colspan=9 style=| Exhibition

|-
!colspan=9 style=| Regular season

|-
!colspan=12 style=| ACC Tournament

|-
!colspan=12 style=| NCAA tournament

References

Duke Blue Devils men's basketball seasons
Duke Blue Devils
Duke
Duke
Duke